In Christian theology, conditionalism or conditional immortality is a concept in which the gift of immortality is attached to (conditional upon) belief in Jesus Christ. This doctrine is based in part upon another biblical argument, that the human soul is naturally mortal, immortality ("eternal life") is therefore granted by God as a gift. This viewpoint stands in contrast to the more popular doctrine of the "natural immortality" of the soul. Conditionalism is practically synonymous with annihilationism, the belief that the unsaved will be ultimately destroyed, rather than suffer unending physical torment in hell. The view is also sometimes connected with the idea of soul sleep, in which the dead sleep unconscious until the Resurrection of the Dead to stand for a Last Judgment before the World to Come.

Protestantism
The British Evangelical Alliance ACUTE report states the doctrine is a "significant minority evangelical view" that has "grown within evangelicalism in recent years". In the 20th century, conditional immortality was considered by certain theologians in the Eastern Orthodox Church.

It is argued that these passages, along with  teach that human beings will naturally die without continued access to God's life-giving power.

As a general rule, conditionalism goes hand in hand with annihilationism; that is, the belief that the souls of the wicked will be destroyed in Gehenna (often translated "hell", especially by non-conditionalists and non-universalists) fire rather than suffering eternal torment. The two ideas are not exactly equivalent, however, because in principle God may annihilate a soul which was previously created immortal. While annihilationism places emphasis on the active destruction of a person, conditionalism places emphasis on a person's dependence upon God for life; the extinction of the person is thus a passive consequence of separation from God, much like natural death is a consequence of prolonged separation from food, water, and air.

In secular historical analysis, the doctrine of conditional immortality reconciles the ancient Hebrew view that humans are mortal with the Christian view that the saved will live forever.

Belief in forms of conditionalism became a current in Protestantism beginning with the Reformation, but it was only adopted as a formal doctrinal tenet by denominations such as early Unitarians, the churches of the English Dissenting Academies, then Seventh-day Adventists, Christadelphians, the Bible Students and Jehovah's Witnesses.

Moralist writers, such as Thomas Hobbes in Leviathan, have often argued that the doctrine of natural (or innate) immortality stems not from Hebrew thought as presented in the Bible, but rather from pagan influence, particularly Greek philosophy and the teachings of Plato, or Christian tradition. Bishop of Durham N.T. Wright noted that  teaches "God… alone is immortal," while in  it says that immortality only comes to human beings as a gift through the gospel.  Immortality is something to be sought after therefore it is not inherent to all humanity.

These groups may claim that the doctrine of conditional immortality reconciles two seemingly conflicting traditions in the Bible: the ancient Hebrew concept that the human being is mortal with no meaningful existence after death (see שאול, Sheol and the Book of Ecclesiastes), and the later Jewish and Christian belief in the resurrection of the dead and personal immortality after Judgment Day.

References

External links
Conditionalimmortality.org Introductory articles on why Conditionalism is correct.  Includes "Answering the critics" section.
Defining Conditionalism Christian conditionalism is essentially an anthropological terms.  It describes the nature of humanity as the Bible represents it. The article defines the term. 
The Logic of Conditionalism Discusses the implications of Christian conditionalism for other branches of Christian theology.
Jewish not Greek Shows how Biblical hermeneutics proves "conditional immortality" and not the Greek philosophical view of innate immortality.
The Resurrection and Immortality An exhaustive study into the biblical definition of immortality and proof of conditional immortality.

Freedom From Fear: What happens when you die?
Truth About Death Comprehensive site covering questions and answers regarding Christian conditionalism

 A Tour de Force for conditional immortality by a Frenchman.
 Three early essays from one of the classical advocates of conditional immortality. See especially "Appendix 1: Answers to Objections Urged Against the Doctrine of the Gradual Extinction of Obdurate Sinners," beginning on page 147 of the book.
 Perhaps the best and most sophisticated demonstration of conditional immortality, both rationally and biblically. See Hudson's book Christ Our Life listed immediately below for an expanded biblical defense.
 A thorough, sophisticated argument from the Bible for conditional immortality.
. Exceptional biblical argument for conditional immortality, though White posits an intermediate conscious state of the soul pace the standard conditional immortality belief that the dead are unconscious.
 An excellent place to begin a study on conditional immortality from a Seventh-Day-Adventist scholar.
Rethinking Hell Exploring Evangelical Conditionalism.
Afterlife.co.nz The Conditional Immortality Association of New Zealand Inc. is a non-profit organization established to promote a Biblical understanding of human nature, life, death and eternity as taught throughout Scripture.
 US , GB . This book deals with the fundamentals of being human; living and dying, life and death. It answers such questions as .. What is death? Why does man die? What is the key to eternal life? What is resurrection?

Salvation in Protestantism
Seventh-day Adventist theology
Christian terminology
Annihilationism

pl:Kondycjonalizm